Håkan Bråkan & Josef is a Swedish comedy film which was released to cinemas in Sweden on 8 October 2004, directed by Erik Leijonborg and based on Anders Jacobsson and Sören Olsson's stories about Håkan, a Sune spinoff character.

Actors

Production
Recordings began in the Stockholm district by late-August 2003, only to later continue in Trollhättan.

Soundtrack
The original film soundtrack was released to CD in 2004.

Home video
In 2005 the film was released to DVD and VHS and in 2011 it also became available in the "Håkan Bråkan-boxen" box set, consisting of both the TV series "Håkan Bråkan" and the film Håkan Bråkan & Josef.

References

External links
Internet Movie Database 

2004 films
2004 comedy films
Films based on works by Anders Jacobsson and Sören Olsson
Swedish comedy films
2000s Swedish-language films
Film spin-offs
Films shot in Stockholm
Films shot in Trollhättan
2000s Swedish films